The  is an ancient highway in Mutsu Province which connected the Ōshū Kaidō to the Dewa Kaidō in the Tōhoku region of northern Japan. A surviving portion of the ancient road in the city of Ōsaki, Miyagi has been protected as a National Historic Site since 1990.

Overview
The Mutsu Kami Kaidō extended from what is now Hiraizumi, Iwate through Ichinoseki, and Kurihara and  Ōsaki in Miyagi Prefecture. The origin of the road is unknown; however, it was mentioned in the Kamakura period Azuma Kagami as the route taken by Minamoto no Yoritomo during his invasion of Ōshū in 1189 to destroy the Northern Fujiwara. It is also famous as the route that the Edo Period poet Basho took on his return from visiting the ruins of Hiraizumi. It was formerly also called the "Matsuyama-dō"

The National Historic Site designation covers a 2.8 kilometer stretch of the route in the former town of Iwadeyama, including a 1500 meter stretch which is lined with pine trees on both sides. The Miyagi Prefectural Board of Education conducted a survey on this highway over four years from 1978 to 1982. The route has been repaired with numerous explanatory placards, and includes a surviving pair of ichirizuka mounds. The site is located about 50 minutes on foot from Kaminome Station on the JR East Rikuu East Line.

See also

List of Historic Sites of Japan (Miyagi)

References

External links
 Miyagi Prefecture Official site 

History of Miyagi Prefecture
Mutsu Province
Historic Sites of Japan
Road transport in Japan